Sialkot is a village in Mansehra District, Khyber Pakhtunkhwa, in Pakistan.  It is a tourist destination and close to Abbottabad. Sialkot was previously destroyed in an earthquake.

References 

Populated places in Mansehra District